Jasenná is a municipality and village in Zlín District in the Zlín Region of the Czech Republic. It has about 1,000 inhabitants.

Notable people
Jakub Plšek (born 1993), footballer

References

Villages in Zlín District